Costilla is a census-designated place in Taos County, New Mexico, United States. Its population was 205 as of the 2010 census. Costilla has a post office with ZIP code 87524. State roads 196 and 522 intersect in the community.

History
The village of Costilla was originally known as San Miguel after its church. The Territory of Colorado was created in 1861, and when the new territory created its 17 original counties, San Miguel was designated the Costilla County, Colorado Territory county seat. It wasn't until 1869, that the residents of San Miguel, now renamed Costilla, learned that their village was actually located in the New Mexico Territory.

Geography

Demographics

Education
It is in the Questa Independent Schools school district.

See also
 List of census-designated places in New Mexico

References

External links

Census-designated places in New Mexico
Census-designated places in Taos County, New Mexico